The Kaso River, also Ci Kaso, is a river in the Garut Regency of West Java, Indonesia, about 190 km southeast of the capital Jakarta. Coal-bearing sandstones, clays and limestones are typical geological traits of the Bandung area of southern Java. It flows past Pameungpeuk before flowing into the Indian Ocean.

Geography
The river flows in the southwest area of Java with predominantly tropical rainforest climate (designated as Af in the Köppen-Geiger climate classification). annual average temperature in the area is 24 °C. warmest month is March, when the average temperature is around 25 °C, and the coldest is September, at 22 °C. average annual rainfall is about 3730 mm. wettest month is December, with an average of 542 mm rainfall, and the driest is September, with 61 mm rainfall.

See also
List of rivers of Indonesia
List of rivers of Java

References

Rivers of West Java
Rivers of Indonesia